Sidford is a small village in the civil parish of and on the outskirts of the town of Sidmouth in the English county of Devon. It has a population of just over 2,100 people according to the 2001 Census. The Church of England Church, St Peter's, is part of the Sid Valley Mission.

It gets its name from being on the River Sid, which runs for four miles into Lyme Bay at Sidmouth. One can walk along the river down the Byes into Sidmouth and to the sea. There is a 12th-century packhorse bridge over the river that was the site of a 1644 skirmish in the English Civil War.

In the village centre there is a small Spar supermarket with a post office, a fish and chip shop, Bloaters. There is also a hairdresser, a sports injury clinic, a pub called the Rising Sun and a veterinary surgery. The Salty Monk opposite the Church is a sixteenth century building operated as a bed and breakfast.

In sport, there is the Sidford Tennis Club, and Sidmouth Rugby Club also have training pitches there.

Sidford's most famous pub is the Blue Ball Inn, a 14th-century lodging house that burned to the ground in 2007 and is now rebuilt.

References

External links

Villages in Devon
Sidmouth